Kopren Waterfall is the second highest waterfall in Serbia. Between 16 June 2011, when it was measured, and 9 June 2012, when the waterfall Kaluđerski Skokovi was measured, Kopren was considered the highest waterfall in Serbia.

Location 

The Kopren waterfall is situated in the area of the Dojkinci village, northeast of the city of Pirot, to which it administratively belong. The waterfall is located under the Kopren peak of the Stara Planina mountain.

Characteristics 

It is located on the stream of Dabidžin potok, not far from its spring. The stream itself is the main headwater of the Jelovička river which flows into the Dojkinička river. The waterfall consists of several cascades, ranging from few to over 40 meters. Some  meters below the lowest cascade, there is another waterfall.

History 

The waterfall was discovered in May 2011 by Dragovan Stojadinović. On 16 June 2011 it was measured by Sašа Milanović from the University of Belgrade's Faculty of mining and geology, who measured many other of the highest waterfalls in Serbia. When measured, it was the highest known waterfall in Serbia.

Developments in the recent two decades completely changed the geography of Serbia, when it comes to waterfalls. Area of the Stara Planina has always been sparsely populated and inaccessible because of the rugged and forested terrain, but is also a location of the Serbian-Bulgarian border. When armies relinquished the borders keeping to the police, civilians were allowed to explore the area. As a result, higher and higher waterfalls have been discovered on the Stara Planina since then: Čungulj in 1996 - ; Pilj in 2002 - ; Kopren in 2011 - ; Kaluđerski Skokovi in 2012 - .

References 

Waterfalls of Serbia